HMS Caledonia was a 120-gun first-rate ship of the line of the Royal Navy, launched on 25 June 1808 at Plymouth. She was Admiral Pellew's flagship in the Mediterranean.

Construction
The Admiralty orders for Caledonias construction were issued in November 1794, for a 100-gun vessel measuring approximately 2,600 tons burthen. There were considerable delays in obtaining dockyard facilities and in assembling a workforce, and actual building did not commence until 1805 when the keel was laid down at Plymouth Dockyard. By this time the designs had also been amended to stipulate construction of a 120-gun vessel of 2,616 tons. When completed to this new design in 1808, Caledonia entered Royal Navy service as the largest and most heavily armed vessel of the time.

Active service
Caledonia proved to be a very successful ship, and it was said that 'This fine three-decker rides easy at her anchors, carries her lee ports well, rolls and pitches quite easy, generally carries her helm half a turn a-weather, steers, works and stays remarkably well, is a weatherly ship, and lies-to very close.' She was 'allowed by all hands to be faultless'. In later years she was to become the standard design for British three-deckers.

On 12 February 1814 she took part with HMS Boyne in action against the French ship of the line Romulus off Toulon; the French vessel managed to escape to Toulon by sailing close to the coast to avoid being surrounded.

In 1831 she was part of the Experimental Squadron of the Channel Fleet under Sir Edward Codrington. On 12 September that year she took part in an experiment whereby she was towed by the frigate HMS Galatea by means of hand-worked paddles alone.

In 1856 she was converted to a hospital ship, renamed Dreadnought and became the second floating Dreadnought Seamen's Hospital at Greenwich, where she remained until 1870. In 1871 she was briefly returned to service, as a lazaret, to accommodate patients recovering from the smallpox epidemic of that year. Towed to the breakers in 1872, she was broken up in 1875.

Notes

References

External links
 

Ships of the line of the Royal Navy
Caledonia-class ships of the line
1808 ships